Whitestick Creek is a stream in the U.S. state of West Virginia.

Whitestick most likely is a name derived from an unidentified Native American language.

See also
List of rivers of West Virginia

References

Rivers of Raleigh County, West Virginia
Rivers of West Virginia